Cyperus karlschumannii is a species of sedge that is native to western parts of Africa.

The species was first formally described by the botanist Charles Baron Clarke in 1906.

See also
 List of Cyperus species

References

karlschumannii
Taxa named by Charles Baron Clarke
Plants described in 1906
Flora of Chad
Flora of Burkina Faso
Flora of the Democratic Republic of the Congo
Flora of Ghana
Flora of Ivory Coast
Flora of Togo
Flora of Nigeria
Flora of Mali